The Latah Formation is a series of late Miocene lacustrine sedimentary deposits which outcrop in eastern  Washington and northwestern Idaho.  The lake beds are interbedded with igneous rock of the Columbia River Basalt Group. The formation was originally detailed from a site in Spokane, Washington by Dr. Kirk Bryan in a 1923 talk, and then formally described in a 1926 journal article by Joseph Pardee and Bryan.  When first described the formation was thought to have predated the deposition of the Columbia River Basalts, however further investigation showed them to be interbedded, being laid down in successive events. Potassium-argon dating of the formation returned an age range of 21.3 to 12.1 million years old, indicating an Early to Middle Miocene age range. Numerous fossil plants and insects have been recovered from the formation and described. The Latah Formation includes the Clarkia fossil beds in Idaho.

References

Neogene geology of Washington (state)
Geologic formations of Idaho
Miocene Series of North America